Alexander F. Eke (October 9, 1912 – January 28, 2004) was a British basketball player who competed in the 1948 Summer Olympics. He was born in Westminster.

Eke was part of the British basketball team, which finished twentieth in the 1948 Olympic tournament.

References

External links
profile

1912 births
2004 deaths
British men's basketball players
Olympic basketball players of Great Britain
Basketball players at the 1948 Summer Olympics